Caritas University is a private Catholic university in Amorji-Nike, Enugu State, Nigeria. Enjoying both state and ecclesiastical approval, it strives to revive in its community the age-long tradition of Catholic education and the exacting demand of contemporary society for sound education rooted in salubrious life-promoting morality.

Origin

Caritas University was approved by the federal government of Nigeria on December 16, 2004. It was officially opened on January 21, 2005 by the federal Minister for Education, Prof. Fabian Osuji. The formal opening was on January 31, 2005. The pioneer students of 250 matriculated on May 28, 2005.

It is the second Catholic university in Nigeria founded by Rev. Fr. Prof. Emmanuel Paul Mattew Edeh C.S.Sp, OFR after Madonna University of the same founder. Although he founded the school, the proprietor of the university is the Congregation of Sisters of Jesus the Saviour, a religious congregation of nuns founded by him.

Objective
Her principal objective is to remain in the frontline of centres of learning, teaching and research. As a Nigerian University with difference, Caritas university works for the improvement of her local community as well as for an active contribution to the needs of the international community in the aforementioned areas.

Her Boards of Directors, have also succeeded in making Caritas university one of the most affordable universities in Enugu state, With Morals and Education as her main Goal and Directive, Caritas university deems to excel in bringing out the best in her Student individuals and also Lecturers.

Academics

The University operates on a faculty system. The university operates six faculties: Education and Arts, Engineering, Environmental Sciences, Management Sciences, Social Sciences and Natural Sciences.

References

External links 
 

Educational institutions established in 2005
Universities and colleges in Nigeria
2005 establishments in Nigeria
Enugu State
Catholic universities and colleges in Nigeria